is a station in Ōda, Shimane Prefecture, Japan.

Lines
 West Japan Railway Company (JR West)
 San'in Main Line

Adjacent stations
West Japan Railway Company (JR West)

Railway stations in Japan opened in 1915
Railway stations in Shimane Prefecture
Sanin Main Line